The Amazing Adventures of Kavalier & Clay is a 2000 novel by American author Michael Chabon that won the Pulitzer Prize for Fiction in 2001. The novel follows the lives of two Jewish cousins, Czech artist Joe Kavalier and Brooklyn-born writer Sammy Clay, before, during, and after World War II. In the novel, Kavalier and Clay become major figures in the comics industry from its nascency into its Golden Age.  Kavalier & Clay was published to "nearly unanimous praise" and became a New York Times Best Seller, receiving nominations for the 2000 National Book Critics Circle Award and PEN/Faulkner Award for Fiction. In 2006, Bret Easton Ellis declared the novel "one of the three great books of my generation," and in 2007, The New York Review of Books called the novel Chabon's magnum opus.

The novel's publication was followed by several companion projects, including two short stories published by Chabon that consist of material apparently written for the novel but not included: "The Return of the Amazing Cavalieri" in McSweeney's Quarterly Concern (2001), and "Breakfast in the Wreck" in The Virginia Quarterly Review (2004). In 2004, a coda to the novel was published separately under the title "A Postscript", in Zap! Pow! Bam! The Superhero: The Golden Age of Comic Books, 1938–1950. From 2004 to 2006, Dark Horse Comics published two series of Escapist comic books based on the superhero stories described in the novel, some of which were written by Chabon. Dark Horse Comics also published a comics-format "sequel" to the novel: The Escapists, written by Brian K. Vaughan and illustrated by Jason Shawn Alexander and Steve Rolston.

Plot summary
The novel begins in 1939 with the arrival by Greyhound bus of 19-year-old Josef "Joe" Kavalier as a refugee in New York City, where he comes to live with his 17-year-old cousin, Sammy Klayman, in Brooklyn. With the help of his mentor, Kornblum, Joe escapes Nazi-occupied Prague for Lithuania by hiding in a coffin he shares with the Golem of Prague. Joe makes it to New York City by way of Japan and San Francisco. Joe leaves behind the rest of his family, including his younger brother Thomas. As the novel develops, both Joe and Sammy find their creative niches, one entrepreneurial, the other artistic. Beyond having a shared interest in drawing, the duo share several connections to Jewish stage magician Harry Houdini: Josef (like comics legend Jim Steranko) studied magic and escapology in Prague, which aided him in his departure from Europe. Sammy is the son of the Mighty Molecule, a strongman on the vaudeville circuit.

When Sammy discovers Joe's artistic talent, he gets Joe a job as an illustrator for a novelty products company, Empire Novelty. Sheldon Anapol, owner of Empire, motivated to share in the recent cultural and financial success of Superman, attempts to break into the comic-book business on the creative backs of Joe and Sammy. Under the name "Sam Clay", Sammy starts writing adventure stories with Joe illustrating them, and the two recruit several other Brooklyn teenagers to produce Amazing Midget Radio Comics (named to promote one of the company's novelty items). The pair is at once passionate about their creation, earnestly optimistic about making money, and always nervous about the opinion of their employers. 

The magazine features Sammy and Joe's character, the Escapist, an anti-fascist superhero who combines traits of (among others) Houdini, Captain America, Batman, the Phantom, and the Scarlet Pimpernel. The Escapist becomes tremendously popular, but like the talent behind Superman, the writers and artists of the comic get a minimal share of their publisher's revenue. Joe and Sammy are slow to realize that they are being exploited, as they have private concerns: Joe is trying to help his family escape from Prague and has fallen in love with the bohemian Rosa Saks, who has her own artistic aspirations, while Sammy works to find his sexual identity and seeks to progress in his professional and literary career.

For many months after coming to New York, Joe's drive to help his family shows through in his work, which remains violently anti-Nazi despite his employer's concerns. In the meantime, he spends more and more time with Rosa, appearing as a magician at the bar mitzvahs of the children of Rosa's father's acquaintances, even though he sometimes feels guilty for distracting himself from fighting for his family. Joe's efforts to bring his family to the States culminate in securing passage for his younger brother Thomas (Tommy) on the ship The Ark of Miriam. On the eve of the attack on Pearl Harbor, however, Tommy's ship is sunk by a German U-boat. Distraught and unaware that Rosa is pregnant with his child, Joe abruptly leaves to enlist in the Navy, where he was hoping to fight the Germans. Instead, he is sent to a secluded naval base in Antarctica that had two nicknames: Kelvinator Station and Lupe Velez. After an obstructed chimney fills the base with carbon monoxide from a gasoline-powered heater, Joe emerges from this interlude as one of only three survivors among the sailors and dogs at Kelvinator Station: two service members and a canine. When he makes it back to New York, Joe is ashamed to show his face again to Rosa and Sammy and eschews their expected reunion. Unbeknownst to his previous contacts in the city, he squats in a hideout in the Empire State Building, with only a small circle of magician friends aware of his whereabouts.

Parallel to Joe's experiences leading up to the United States' entrance into the war, Sammy develops a romantic relationship with the radio voice of The Escapist, the handsome Tracy Bacon. Tracy's movie-star good looks initially intimidate Sammy, but later they fall in love. When Tracy is cast as The Escapist for the film adaptation, he invites Sammy to move to Hollywood with him, an offer that Clay accepts. But later, when Tracy and Sammy go to a friend's beach house in New Jersey with several other gay couples, the private dinner is raided by the local police as well as by two off-duty FBI agents. All of the men at the party are arrested, except for two who hide under the dinner table. The FBI agents make one last sweep and find the two hidden men, one of whom is Sammy. They use their authority to sexually abuse Sammy and the other man. Following this episode, Sammy decides that he cannot live with the constant threat of persecution and breaks off his relationship with Tracy. When Joe leaves to fight in the war, Sammy marries Rosa and moves with her to the suburbs, where they raise her son Tommy in what outwardly appears to be a traditional nuclear family.

Sammy and Rosa cannot hide all their secrets from Tommy, however, who encounters Joe and begins to take private magic lessons in the Empire State Building with him for the better part of a year without anyone else's knowledge. Tommy is instrumental in finally reuniting the duo of Kavalier and Clay, who swiftly find renewed enthusiasm in their comic endeavors. Joe moves into Sammy and Rosa's house and begins to rekindle his romance with Rosa. Shortly afterward, Sammy's homosexuality is revealed to the public on national television when he appears before Senator Estes Kefauver's Senate Subcommittee on Juvenile Delinquency investigating claims of comic books' pernicious effect on children. This further complicates the attempts of Rosa, Sammy, and Joe to reconstitute a family. In the end, Sammy decides to move to Los Angeles despite Joe and Rosa's attempts to dissuade him, including Joe's revelation that he has bought Empire Comics. The following morning, they find his bed made and Sammy gone.

Inspiration 
Many events in the novel are based on the lives of actual comic-book creators, including Jack Kirby (to whom the book is dedicated in the afterword), Bob Kane, Stan Lee, Jerry Siegel, Joe Shuster, Joe Simon, Will Eisner and Jim Steranko. Other historical figures play minor roles, including Salvador Dalí, Al Smith, Orson Welles and Fredric Wertham. The novel's time span roughly mirrors that of the Golden Age of Comics itself, starting from shortly after the debut of Superman and concluding with the Kefauver Senate hearings, two events often used to demarcate the era.

Characters
 Josef "Joe" Kavalier – One of the title characters – a 19-year-old Jewish refugee from Prague.
 Sammy Klayman, a.k.a. Sam Clay – the other title character – Joe Kavalier's 17-year-old American cousin.
 Rosa Saks – A bohemian artist who becomes Joe's love interest and later Sam's wife.
 Tracy Bacon – A handsome actor who plays the Escapist and helps Sam come to terms with his sexual identity. He helps add to the theme of escapism, and helps Sammy metaphorically escape out of his body.
 Sheldon Anapol – The owner of Empire Comics, the company that Sam and Joe work for.
 George Deasey – Chief editor of Empire Comics.
 The Escapist – Comic book superhero and brainchild of Kavalier & Clay. Embodies the wishes of the cousins.
 Luna Moth – Kavalier & Clay's primary female character. Joe came up with her largely on his own after meeting Rosa Saks.
 Bernard Kornblum – Joe Kavalier's magic and escapology teacher in Prague.
 Carl Ebling - A Nazi sympathizer who makes threats against Empire Comics due to Sam and Joe's work.
 Ethel Klayman – Sam Clay's mother.
 Mighty Molecule – Stage name of Sam Clay's vaudevillian father, Alter Klayman, a strongman who was crushed to death under the wheels of a tractor he was trying to upend at a fairground.
 Thomas Masaryk Kavalier – Joe Kavalier's younger brother, who was on his way to America when his ship was sunk by a German U-boat on the eve of the attack on Pearl Harbor.
 Thomas Edison Clay – Joe Kavalier and Rosa Saks Clay's biological son, Tommy, and Sam Clay's stepson and first cousin once removed. Tommy is told he is Sam Clay's son until the reappearance of "Cousin Joe."
 Longman Harkoo – Father of Rosa Saks and father-in-law to Sam Clay.
 John Wesley Shannenhouse – Eccentric Navy pilot stationed with Joe in Antarctica. 
 Al Smith – Former governor of New York and 1928 Democratic nominee for president.
 Estes Kefauver – Chairman of Senate Subcommittee on Juvenile Delinquency.
 Harry Houdini – Born Erik Weisz, escape artist, illusionist, stunt performer.
 Eleanor Roosevelt – First Lady of the United States.
 Salvador Dalí – Acclaimed Spanish surrealist painter and sculptor, known for his flamboyant personality.
 Orson Welles – Co-wrote, produced, directed and starred in title role of "Citizen Kane."

Reception
In a contemporary review for The Guardian, Stephanie Merritt praised the book, saying, "Kavalier and Clay deserves a place alongside the best of recent American fiction." Entertainment Weekly put the novel on its end-of-the-decade "best-of" list, saying, "This 2000 novel blended comic books, Jewish mysticism, and American history into something truly amazing." In 2019, The Amazing Adventures of Kavalier & Clay was ranked 57th on The Guardians list of the 100 best books of the 21st century.

Editions
 U.S.: 2000, Random House, hardcover, 
 U.S.: 2001, Picador, paperback, 
 U.S.: 2012, Random House, paperback and e-book, . This edition includes a reader's guide and an "Odds & Ends" section containing additional pieces by the author: "Breakfast in the Wreck", "The Return of the Amazing Cavalieri", "The Crossover", and "Fifty Dollars Takes it Home".

Adaptations

Film
As of 2022, the novel remains unfilmed. Producer Scott Rudin, who had worked with Chabon in the early nineties on The Gentlemen Host, bought the screen rights to The Amazing Adventures of Kavalier & Clay for Paramount Pictures based on a one-and-a-half page pitch before the novel had been published. (Rudin was involved with the novel so early on that his name appears in the acknowledgements to its first edition.) After the book was published, Rudin hired Chabon to write the screen adaptation. In July 2002, it was reported that the process had taken 16 months and six drafts, none of which pleased the demanding Rudin. "It's like those arcade games where a gopher head pops out", Chabon said at the time. "I fix this and then another head pops out."  Rudin explained that his problems with the drafts often derived from scenes in the book he wanted kept in the film and which Chabon, "incredibly unprecious about his work", had cut.

In their 2002 "It List", Entertainment Weekly declared Kavalier & Clay the year's "It Script", publishing a short excerpt from the screenplay. Chabon told the publication, "A lot of things about the book are really a pain in the neck [to adapt]....The story takes place over this huge span of time. There's an 11-year gap in the middle when we don't see the characters at all. I wrote the first draft of the screenplay from memory, as if there were no novel at all and I were just remembering a story that I had heard.... Much less time passes in the movie than in the book. It's really just the period of the war."  While at that point, the film was in active pre-production (with Sydney Pollack attached to direct and Jude Law in talks to play Kavalier), by late 2004 Chabon had declared the film project "very much dead".

In November of that same year, though, director Stephen Daldry announced in The New York Times that he planned to direct the film "next year."  In January 2005, Chabon posted on his web site that, "about a month ago, there was a very brief buzzing, as of a fruit fly, around the film version of The Amazing Adventures of Kavalier & Clay. It was a casting-buzz. It went like this: Tobey Maguire as Sam Clay. Jamie Bell as Joe Kavalier. Natalie Portman as Rosa Saks. It buzzed very seriously for about eleven minutes. Then it went away." Actors Andrew Garfield, Ryan Gosling, Ben Whishaw and Jason Schwartzman were also considered for parts in the project with Wishaw and Garfield doing scenes for a screen test titled The Window, Shabbos Dinner, The Return, The Story of the Golem, War Is Over.

In June 2006, Chabon maintained that Portman was still "a strong likelihood for the part of Rosa", and listed a number of important plot points present in the book that would be left out of the movie. The list included the scene between Clay and Tracy Bacon in the ruins of the 1939 New York World's Fair (though the film would still feature a gay love story), the Long Island scene, and the appearances of Orson Welles and Stan Lee.  Chabon added that "whether [this project] will move at last ... into really-truly pre-production, with a budget and cast and everything, will be decided on or around 12 July 2006." Jamie Caliri, director of music videos and other short films, posted 2 and a half minutes of concept footage on his Vimeo channel, stating, "This piece was made as part of the development process... They asked me to explore animation concepts. I thought it would be much more fun to actually shoot a section of the script to intertwine live action and animation." In August 2006, however, it was reported that the film had "not been greenlit".  In April 2007, Chabon added that the project "just completely went south for studio-politics kinds of reasons that I'm not privy to.... Right now, as far as I know, there's not a lot going on."

Television 

In a December 2011 interview, Stephen Daldry stated that he was considering making a Kavalier & Clay adaptation as a television miniseries rather than a feature film, preferring to do it "on HBO as an eight-parter...If you could put that in the article and ring up HBO and tell them that’s what I wanna do, I’d really appreciate it." In 2019, CBS TV studios signed a multi-year production pact with Chabon and his wife and writing partner Ayelet Waldman including plans to adapt the novel as a Showtime series. Chabon confirmed in 2020 that he and Waldman were working on the script together, anticipating an initial run of "two eight-episode seasons."

Opera

In 2018, The Metropolitan Opera announced that they were in talks to co-commission an opera based on the novel, with Opera Philadelphia.

Stage

In 2014, Seattle-based Book-It Repertory Theatre produced a stage adaptation written by Jeff Schwager. The production ran from June 8 to July 13, 2014, and featured a five-hour running time, including a 40-minute meal break.

Cultural references
Josef "Joe" Kavalier is referred to in the 2006 novel The Chinatown Death Cloud Peril by Paul Malmont. The novel describes the friendship and rivalry among pulp writers of the 1930s; it also includes Lester Dent, Walter B. Gibson, and L. Ron Hubbard.

In a 2012 interview, Benedict Cumberbatch (Sherlock) mentioned his interest in playing in the movie if it ever emerges from development hell.

The Amazing Adventures of Kavalier & Clay is one of the essential items from the "Seth Cohen Starter Pack", portrayed by the actor Adam Brody in the American TV show The O.C.

In 2016, a fan-made animated opening sequence to the film was uploaded onto Vimeo.

In the novel, one of the early comics' covers has a painting of The Escapist punching Adolf Hitler in the jaw (on some editions of the book itself, this is also the cover art).  This is a reference to the real-life comic book series Captain America Comics, which showed the protagonist punching Hitler on the cover its first issue, published a year before the attack on Pearl Harbor.

References

External links
 Michael Chabon author web site
 "The Escapist v.s. The Iron Gauntlet", Pre-production concept footage, Jamie Caliri

 Interview with Michael Chabon about The Escapist
 Photos of the first edition of The Amazing Adventures of Kavalier & Clay

The Amazing Adventures of Kavalier & Clay One Book, One Chicago web site

Novels by Michael Chabon
Superhero novels
2000 American novels
Golem
Pulitzer Prize for Fiction-winning works
Novels set in New York City
Novels set in Prague
Novels about artists
Novels with gay themes
Empire State Building in fiction
Random House books
Cultural depictions of Harry Houdini
Cultural depictions of Orson Welles
Cultural depictions of Salvador Dalí
PEN/Faulkner Award for Fiction-winning works
Postmodern novels
Books about comics
2000s LGBT novels
American LGBT novels
Refugees and displaced people in fiction
2000 LGBT-related literary works